Rosmira fedele may refer to:

Partenope (Vinci) 1725
Rosmira fedele, pasticcio by Vivaldi 1738